West African campaign may refer to:

West Africa campaign (World War I)
West Africa campaign (World War II)